G. salicifolia may refer to:
 Garrya salicifolia, the willowleaf silktassel, a plant species in the genus Garrya found in Baja California, Mexico
 Geijera salicifolia, a plant species found in Australia, New Caledonia and Papua New Guinea
 Grewia salicifolia, a flowering plant species

See also
 Salicifolia (disambiguation)